(born 22 August 1967) is a Japanese fencer. She competed in the women's team foil event at the 1988 Summer Olympics.

References

External links
 

1967 births
Living people
Japanese female foil fencers
Olympic fencers of Japan
Fencers at the 1988 Summer Olympics
Asian Games medalists in fencing
Fencers at the 1990 Asian Games
Fencers at the 1994 Asian Games
Asian Games silver medalists for Japan
Asian Games bronze medalists for Japan
Medalists at the 1990 Asian Games
Medalists at the 1994 Asian Games
20th-century Japanese women
21st-century Japanese women